Armed and Dangerous may refer to:
 Armed & Dangerous (Razor album), a 1984 album by Razor
 Armed and Dangerous (EP), a 1985 EP by Anthrax
 "Armed and Dangerous", a song by Anthrax from Spreading the Disease
 "Armed & Dangerous" (King Von song), 2020
 "Armed and Dangerous" (song), a 2018 song by Juice Wrld
 Armed and Dangerous (1986 film), a 1986 film by Mark L. Lester starring John Candy, Meg Ryan, Eugene Levy and Jonathan Banks
 Armed and Dangerous (1977 film), a 1977 Soviet western film
 Armed and Dangerous (video game), a 2003 computer and Xbox game by Planet Moon Studios
 Armed and Dangerous (comics), a comics series
 "Armed and Dangerous" (Batwoman), an episode of Batwoman
 Armed and Dangerous, an expansion for the board game RoboRally
 Eric S. Raymond's (born 1957) blog